Ekeby is a locality situated in Södertälje Municipality, Stockholm County, Sweden with 1,018 inhabitants in 2010.

References 

Populated places in Södertälje Municipality